Fire Station No. 21 may refer to:

Steam Engine Company No. 21, Louisville, Kentucky, listed on the National Register of Historic Places (NRHP)
Engine Company 21, Washington, D.C., NRHP-listed

See also
List of fire stations